PRSP may refer to:

Poverty Reduction Strategy Paper, documents required by the International Monetary Fund and World Bank
 Penicillin-resistant Streptococcus pneumoniae, a Streptococcus species resistant to antibiotics
Perspecta (defense contractor), publicly traded IT Service Management Company